Adil Baig (born February 14, 1983) is a Pakistani swimmer. He competed at the 2008 Summer Olympics.

References

Swimmers at the 2008 Summer Olympics
Olympic swimmers of Pakistan
Pakistani male swimmers
1983 births
Living people
Place of birth missing (living people)
South Asian Games silver medalists for Pakistan
South Asian Games medalists in swimming
21st-century Pakistani people